Francisco Ubiera (born 21 August 1990) is a Dominican international footballer who plays as a defender.

Career
Ubiera has played college soccer for the Florida Gulf Coast University and the Florida Institute of Technology.

He made his international debut for Dominican Republic in 2011, and has appeared in FIFA World Cup qualifying matches.

References

1990 births
Living people
Dominican Republic footballers
Dominican Republic international footballers
Florida Gulf Coast University alumni
Florida Gulf Coast Eagles men's soccer players
Florida Tech Panthers men's soccer players
Association football defenders
People from La Romana, Dominican Republic